Romantic Noy is a Bengali drama film based on male prostitution, Saheb Bhattacharya plays the role of a prostitute who sells his body to women. The film was directed by Rajib Chowdhury and produced by Omprakash Saraogi. It was released on 18 November 2016 in the banner of Om Cine Movies. This is Chowdhury's directorial debut in Tollywood Film Industry. The music is released by Amara Muzik.

Plot
A small town boy Shekhar comes Kolkata to stay and earn money. He falls in love with Sumitra. Partha, a gay friend of Shekhar introduces him with Shilpi madam and he enters in a sex racket of Kolkata. He became a gigolo or a male prostitute and started to selling his body to women and thereafter starts journey into darkness, loses his love. Shekhar has no way out but to succumb to her (Shipli madam's) pressure and cater to the lustful demands of his clients. He begins to lead a frustrated life of drugs, alcohol and sex. With his erotic beauty he seduced girls who became his clients. At this point of time he meet a girl Medha who brings a new wave of happiness in Shekhar's life and Shekhar thinks to start his life again. But when Medha knows about the truth about Shekhar she breaks up with Shekhar, because of Shekhar is a whore. At last Shekhar return to his hometown from Kolkata to start a new life.

Cast
 Saheb Bhattacharya as Shekhar
 Soumitra Chatterjee as Psychiatrist
 June Malia as Shilpi
 Priyanka Sarkar as Medha
 Sayani Datta as Sumitra
 Rajesh Sharma as Shekar's boss
 Moumita Mitra
 Deboprasad Halder
 Parthosarathi Chakraborty as Partha

See also
 American Gigolo
 Male prostitution
 Gigolo
 Male prostitution in the arts
 Female sex tourism
 Magic Mike
 Magic Mike XXL
 Ladykillers
 Chocolate City
 Chocolate City: Vegas Strip

References

2016 films
2010s erotic drama films
Indian erotic drama films
Films set in Kolkata
Bengali-language Indian films
2010s Bengali-language films
2016 drama films